KITH (98.9 FM) is a radio station broadcasting an Island Music format.  Licensed to Kapaa, Hawaii, United States.  The station is currently owned by Hochman Hawaii Two, Inc.

History
The station went on the air as KAWT on August 1, 1997. On November 7, 2000, the station changed its call sign to the current KITH.

References

External links

Hawaiian-music formatted radio stations
ITH
Radio stations established in 1997